Haiwan is a 2018 Pakistani drama serial that premiered on 10 October 2018 on ARY Digital. It is directed by Mazhar Moin and written by Sara Sadain Syed. It stars Faysal Qureshi, Savera Nadeem and Sanam Chaudhry. The serial is produced by Abdullah Seja under the production company Idream Entertainment.

The theme of the serial is focused on awareness to parents about child abuse and follow the trend #MyChildMyResponsibility.

Cast 
Faysal Qureshi as Hameed
Savera Nadeem as Azra 
Sanam Chaudhry as Momina 
Wahaj Ali as maan
Maryam Noor as Savera
Iffat Umer as Amna
Shaista Jabeen
Saife Hassan as Momina and Masooma's father (dead)
Areesha Ahsan (Child Star) as Masooma
Syeda Hurain (Child Star) as Javeria "Jojo"

Awards and nominations

References

External links 
Official website

2018 Pakistani television series debuts
Pakistani drama television series
Urdu-language television shows
ARY Digital original programming